The brown-breasted bamboo tyrant (Hemitriccus obsoletus) is a species of bird in the family Tyrannidae. It is found in Argentina and Brazil.

Its natural habitat is subtropical or tropical moist montane forests.

References

brown-breasted bamboo tyrant
Birds of the Atlantic Forest
brown-breasted bamboo tyrant
Taxonomy articles created by Polbot